Gregorio Sierra Pérez (born 5 March 1993), commonly known as Grego, is a Spanish footballer who plays for Burgos CF as either a central defender or defensive midfielder.

Club career
Grego was born in Murcia, and was a Real Murcia youth graduate. He made his senior debut with the reserves in 2011, in Tercera División.

In 2012 Grego moved to another reserve team, Atlético Madrid C also in the fourth tier. On 30 July of the following year he joined fellow league team SD Noja, but after being rarely used he terminated his contract and signed for Mar Menor CF in January 2014.

On 10 July 2015, after another one-year spell back at Murcia's B-side, Grego first arrived in Segunda División B, after agreeing to a contract with La Hoya Lorca CF. Roughly one year later, he joined fellow league side Valencia CF Mestalla.

On 28 June 2017, after missing out promotion in the play-offs, Grego signed a two-year contract with Segunda División club CD Numancia. He made his professional debut on 6 September, starting in a 1–0 away win against Real Oviedo, for the season's Copa del Rey.

On 23 January 2019, Grego agreed to a six-month contract with UCAM Murcia CF in the third division, after terminating his contract with Numancia. On 15 July, he moved to fellow league team CE Sabadell FC, being a regular starter as his side achieved promotion to the second tier.

On 31 July 2020, Grego renewed with the Arquelinats for a further campaign. On 6 July 2021, after the club's relegation, he joined Burgos CF also in the second division.

References

External links

1993 births
Living people
Spanish footballers
Footballers from Murcia
Association football defenders
Association football midfielders
Segunda División players
Segunda División B players
Tercera División players
Real Murcia Imperial players
Atlético Madrid C players
Mar Menor FC players
Lorca FC players
Valencia CF Mestalla footballers
CD Numancia players
UCAM Murcia CF players
CE Sabadell FC footballers
Burgos CF footballers